Aapo is a Finnish and Estonian given name derived from Abraham. Notable people with the name include:
 Aapo Häkkinen (born 1976), Finnish musician
 Aapo Halme (born 1998), Finnish football center-back
 Aapo Harjula (1880–1961), Finnish cooperative inspector and politician
 Aapo Heikkilä (born 1994), Finnish footballer
 Aapo Ilves (born 1970), Estonian poet, writer, artist and musician
 Aapo Inkinen (1898–1960), Finnish politician
 Aapo Kyrölä (born 1979), Finnish businessman
 Aapo Mäenpää (born 1998), Finnish footballer
 Aapo Perko (1924–2021), Finnish shot putter
 Aapo Pukk (born 1962), Estonian painter

Finnish masculine given names
Estonian masculine given names